Lakeside Township may refer to:

Lakeside Township, Aitkin County, Minnesota
Lakeside Township, Cottonwood County, Minnesota
Lakeside Township, Meade County, South Dakota, in Meade County, South Dakota

Township name disambiguation pages